The towed AH4 howitzer is a Chinese artillery system manufactured by Norinco. Its main characteristic is that it has been designed to be lightweight, which allows greater tactical mobility. The weight of 4,500 kg, compared to a traditional system that can weigh 18,000 kg, allows the system to be airlifted via heavy-lift helicopters like the CH-47 or Mi-26, or transport aircraft like a C-130 or Y-8. Also, as a modern howitzer system, it possesses a range of engagement of up to 40 km using rocket-assisted projectiles.

Because of its greatly reduced weight, the AH4 can be used in mountain warfare, which was traditionally filled by more portable howitzers such as the 76 mm mountain gun M48 or 105 mm OTO Melara Mod 56.

Design 
The body of the system has forward stabilizers as well as spades and dampers. It has a cannon that can fire 155mm/39 calibre shells with an elevation angle from -3° up to 72° with a traverse limit of 22°. The hydro-pneumatic suspension allows for quick deployment of around 3 minutes and packing in 2 minutes.

AH4 has an initial rate of fire up to 5 rounds per minute, and with continuous shooting at 2 rounds per minute.

Variants
 AHS-4: a 3,000 kg variant that is designed for mountain warfare.

Export to the United Arab Emirates

According to Defense World, in 2016 Norinco's AH4-155 won its first export order from an unidentified customer from the Middle East, it beat the M-777 counterpart from BAE systems. In February 2019, the United Arab Emirates confirmed it had procured the AH4 howitzers, and that it had received at least one batch of six systems.

Comparable howitzers 
 M777 howitzer

References 

155 mm artillery
Howitzers
Artillery of the People's Republic of China